Heterostegane warreni is a moth of the  family Geometridae. It is found in Peninsular Malaysia, Borneo and Sumatra.

External links
The Moths of Borneo

Abraxini
Moths described in 1932